This is a list of compositions by Niels Viggo Bentzon.

Pieces with opus number 

 Op. 1 – Fantasy (Klaviermusik No. 1); for piano
 Op. 2 – Klaviermusik No. 2
 Op. 3 – Small Pieces (7); for piano
 Op. 4 – Violin Sonata No. 1
 Op. 5 – Variations (8) on a Folk Dance; for flute solo
 Op. 6 – Trio No. 1; for violin, viola, and cello
 Op. 7a – Klavermusik No. 4; for piano
 Op. 7b – Klavermusik No. 5; for piano
 Op. 8 – Klavermusik No. 6; for piano
 (Op. 9) – Duo; for violin and cello (incomplete)
 Op. 9 – String Quartet No. 1
 Op. 10 – Toccata; for piano
 Op. 11 – Sonatine; for piano
 Op. 12 – Quintet; for flute, oboe, clarinet, bassoon, and piano
 Op. 13 – Prelude, Intermezzo, and Fugue; for organ
 Op. 14 – Overture; for chamber orchestra
 Op. 15 – Rhapsody; for piano
 Op. 16
 Op. 17 – Variations (6) on a Theme; for flute and piano
 Op. 18 – Suite and Variations; violin solo
 Op. 19 – Divertimento; for strings
 Op. 20 – Trio No. 2; for flute, oboe, and piano
 Op. 21 – Variations; for wind quintet
 Op. 22 – Symphony No. 1
 Op. 23 – Bagatelles (4); for piano
 Op. 24 – Violin Sonata No. 2
 Op. 25 – Trio; violin, cello, and piano
 Op. 26 – Quartet; for flute, oboe, horn, and bassoon
 Op. 27 – Orchestra Sonata; for flute and strings
 Op. 28 – Capriccietta; for violin and piano
 Op. 29 – Wind Quintet No. 3
 Op. 30 – Violin Sonata No. 3
 Op. 31 – Passacaglia; for piano
 Op. 32 – Bagatelle; for string quartet
 Op. 33 – Music for seven instruments; instrumentation unknown
 Op. 33 – Quintet; for violin, clarinet, cello, piano, and guitar
 Op. 34 – Study; for double bass solo
 Op. 35 – √3; for violin and piano
 Op. 36 – Symphony No. 2
 Op. 37 – Prelude and Fugue; for piano
 Op. 38 – Partita; for piano
 Op. 39 – String Quartet No. 2
 Op. 40 – Concert Etude; for piano (originally Piano Sonata No. 1)
 Op. 41 – Pieces (2); for oboe and piano
 Op. 42 – Piano Sonata No. 2
 Op. 43 – Cello Sonata No. 1
 Op. 44 – Piano Sonata No. 3
 Op. 45 – Dance Pieces (3); for piano
 Op. 46 – Symphony No. 3
 Op. 47 – Horn Sonata
 Op. 48 – Concert Etudes (3); for piano
 Op. 49 – Piano Concerto No. 1
 Op. 50 – Inventions (5); for piano
 Op. 51 – Sonata No. 1; for two pianos
 Op. 52 – Chamber Concert; for 11 instruments
 Op. 53 – Sonatina; for violin solo
 Op. 54 – Mosaique Musicale; for flute, violin, cello, and piano
 Op. 55 – Symphony No. 4 Metamorphosis
 Op. 56 – Prelude and Rondo; for chamber orchestra
 Op. 57 – Piano Sonata No. 4
 Op. 58 – Metaphor Ballet-Suite; for orchestra
 Op. 59 – Wind Quintet No. 4
 Op. 60 – Lille Suite; for strings
 Op. 61 – Symphony No. 5 Ellipse
 Op. 62 – Sonatine; for piano
 Op. 63 – Clarinet Sonata
 Op. 64 – Intrada; for orchestra
 Op. 65 – Woodcuts (11); for piano
 Op. 66 – Symphony No. 6
 Op. 67 – Hornbækiana Suite; for violin and piano
 Op. 68 – Nocturnes (2); for piano
 Op. 69 – Piccolo-Concerto; for piano and strings
 Op. 70 – Violin Concerto No. 1
 Op. 71 – English Horn Sonata
 Op. 72 – String Quartet No. 3
 Op. 73 – Trumpet Sonata
 Op. 74 – Oboe Concerto
 Op. 75 – Variazioni Breve; for orchestra
 Op. 76 – Ballads (3); for mezzo-soprano and piano
 Op. 77 – Piano Sonata No. 5
 Op. 78 – Prologue, Rondo, and Epilogue; for 4H piano
 Op. 79 – Songs (2); for soprano and piano
 Op. 80 – Woodwind Quintet
 Op. 81 – Prologue, Dialogue, and Epilogue; for flute and piano
 Op. 82 – Trio; for trumpet, horn, and trombone
 Op. 83 – Symphony No. 7
 Op. 84 – Duo; for violin and cello
 Op. 85 – Capriccio; for piano
 Op. 86 – Kaleidoscope; for piano
 Op. 87 – Piano Concerto No. 3
 Op. 88 – Elegy; for clarinet, bassoon, violin, viola, cello, and double-bass
 Op. 89 – Kurtisanen, ballet
 Op. 90 – Piano Sonata No. 6
 Op. 91 – Quartet; for flute, oboe, bassoon, and piano
 Op. 92 – Symphonic Variations; for orchestra
 Op. 93 – Variations; for flute solo
 Op. 94 – Triple Concerto; for oboe, clarinet, bassoon, and strings
 Op. 95 – String Quartet No. 4
 Op. 96 – Piano Concerto No. 4
 Op. 97 – Pentachord; for piano
 Op. 98 – Theme and Variation; for English horn, violin, and cello
 Op. 99a – Piece; 12 pianos
 Op. 99b – Fantasy and Rondo; for flute and piano
 Op. 100 – Sinfonia Concertante; for violin, viola, cello, clarinet and ensemble
 Op. 101 – Symphonic Suite; for orchestra
 Op. 102 – Suite; for piano
 Op. 103 – Variations (14); for organ
 Op. 104 – Simple Variations (13); for piano
 Op. 105 – String Quartet No. 5
 Op. 106 – Cello Concerto No. 1
 Op. 107 – Pastorale; for orchestra
 Op. 108 – Concertino Hommage to Mozart; for orchestra
 Op. 109 – Pezzi Sinfonici; for orchestra
 Op. 110 – Sonata; for cello solo
 Op. 111 – Pieces (9); for violin and viola
 Op. 112 – Preludes (12); for piano
 Op. 113 – Symphony No. 8 'Sinfonia Discrezione'
 Op. 114 – Concerto per Archi; for strings
 Op. 115 – Concerto; for 6 percussionists
 Op. 116 – Woodwind Quintet No. 5
 Op. 117 – Sonata; for 4H piano
 Op. 118 – Trio; for violin, cello, and piano
 Op. 119 – Symphonic Fantasy; for 2 pianos and orchestra
 Op. 120 – Elementi Aperti, for mezzo-soprano and orchestra
 Op. 121 – Piano Sonata No. 7
 Op. 122 – Violin Sonata No. 4
 Op. 123 – Mutations; for orchestra
 Op. 124 – String Quartet No. 6
 Op. 125 – Mobiles (5); for orchestra
 Op. 126 – Symphony No. 9
 Op. 127 – 2 Monkton-Blues, for orchestra
 Op. 128 – Macbeth; dramatic work
 Op. 129 – Propostae Novae; for 2 pianos
 Op. 130 – Quintet; for flute, violin, viola, cello, and piano
 Op. 131 – Rhapsody; for piano and orchestra
 Op. 132 – Torquilla; oratorio for narrator, SATB soloists, chorus, and orchestra
 Op. 133 – Ostinato; for orchestra
 Op. 134 – Trio; for clarinet, cello, and piano
 Op. 135 – Alleluia; for soprano and organ
 Op. 136 – Violin Concerto No. 2
 Op. 137 – Overture; for small orchestra
 Op. 138 – Bonjour Max Ernest; cantata for chorus and small orchestra
 Op. 139 – Sinfonia da Camera; for chamber orchestra
 Op. 140 – Epitaph; for piano
 Op. 141 – Døren; dramatic work
 Op. 142 – Papuanerdans; for two pianos
 Op. 143 – Sonatine; for two pianos
 Op. 144 – Faust III; opera
 Op. 145 – Koralforspil (3); for organ
 Op. 146 – Accordion Concerto
 Op. 147 – Flute Concerto No. 1
 Op. 148 – Concerto for Orchestra
 Op. 149 – Piano Concerto No. 5
 Op. 150 – Symphony No. 10 Den Hymniske
 Op. 151 – Ballet-Suite Hommage to Jean-Baptiste Lully; for piano
 Op. 152 – Legend; for TB chorus and small ensemble
 Op. 153 – Meet the Danes; for orchestra
 Op. 154 – Suite for Foreigners; for orchestra
 Op. 155 – Overture for the Joyful Ladies of Windsor; for orchestra
 Op. 156 – An Arab in Cologne; for narrator and small ensemble
 Op. 157 – The Tempered Piano vol. 1
 Op. 158 – Symphony No. 11 Salzburg Op. 159 – Two-part Inventions (15); for piano
 Op. 160 – Three-part Inventions (15); for piano
 Op. 161 – Puppets menuet and other Miniatures for Children (9); for piano
 Op. 162 – Vignettes (2); for piano
 Op. 163 – Spanish Portraits (3); for piano
 Op. 164 – In the Zoo; for accordion
 Op. 165 – String Quartet No. 7
 Op. 166 – Symphony No. 12 Tunis Op. 167 – Copenhagen Concert No. 1; for strings
 Op. 168 – Copenhagen Concert No. 2; for strings
 Op. 169 – Copenhagen Concert No. 3; for strings
 Op. 170
 Op. 171
 Op. 172
 Op. 173 – Fredericksburg Suite No. 1; for piano
 Op. 174 – Fredericksburg Suite No. 2; for piano
 Op. 175 – Small Preludes (10); for piano
 Op. 176 – Concerto; for violin, piano, and percussion
 Op. 177 – Jenny Von Westphalen; ballet
 Op. 178 – Sinfonia Concertante No. 1; for 6 accordions and orchestra
 Op. 179 – Stream Music No. 3; for alto sax, trumpet, contrabass, piano, and perc.
 Op. 179 – Montmartre Concert; for piano (graphic notation)
 Op. 180 – Sonatina; for recorder and harpsichord
 Op. 181 – Symphony No. 13 Military Op. 182 – Henry Miller Suite; for cello
 Op. 183 – Violin Sonata No. 5
 Op. 183 – Symphony No. 14 (incomplete)
 Op. 184 – Benumbing Experience; for mixed ensemble
 Op. 185 – Chemical Madrigals; for mixed chorus a capella
 Op. 186 – Spawn, Mycological Suite; for organ
 Op. 187 – Iron Music; for prepared piano, untuned piano, harpsichord
 Op. 188 – Trivial Synonyms; for piano and actor (graphic notation)
 Op. 189 – Clothing Music; for keyboards and requisites (graphic notation)
 Op. 190 – Treasured Monuments; for two pianos w/ preparation, harpsichord, etc.
 Op. 191 – Glazier's Model; for piano (graphic notation)
 Op. 192 – Variable Music for Danish State Radio; for big band and narrator
 Op. 193  – Piano Sonata No. 8 Faust Op. 194 – Piano Sonata No. 9
 Op. 195 – Piano Concerto No. 6
 Op. 196 – Quintet; for string quartet and piano
 Op. 197 – Bijouteri; for vocals, piano, and instruments (graphic notation)
 Op. 198 – European Vitality; for vocals, piano, and instruments (graphic notation)
 Op. 199 – Muhammedansk Document; for chorus and actors (graphic notation)
 Op. 200 – Poetic Sonatine; for oboe solo
 Op. 201 – Mali; for soprano, two percussionists, and piano
 Op. 202 – Ecossaises, for piano
 Op. 203 – Trio; violin, viola, and cello
 Op. 204 – Piano Sonata No. 10 (incomplete)
 Op. 205 – Intelligence and Landscape; for piano (graphic notation)
 Op. 206
 Op. 207 – Ballet 800 Years; for piano
 Op. 208
 Op. 209 – Hazardous Suite; for piano
 Op. 210 – Ballade; for piano
 Op. 211 – Fantasy-Impromptu; for G flute
 Op. 212 – Noble and Sentimental Waltzes (6); for piano
 Op. 213 – Mazurkas (5); for piano
 Op. 214 – Nocturnes in Colors (8); for piano
 Op. 215 – Barcarole; for piano
 Op. 216 – Etudes (7); for piano
 Op. 217 – Camp Duo; for cello and flute
 Op. 218 – Scherzo, for piano
 Op. 219 – Rondo Amoroso, for piano
 Op. 220 – Manfred Overture; for orchestra
 Op. 221 – Columbus eier Salt and Pepper; for accordion
 Op. 222 – European Form and Coda; for piano
 Op. 223 – Cello Sonata No. 2
 Op. 224 – Heroic Piece; for three pianos
 Op. 225 – Concerto; for recorder and other instruments
 Op. 226 – Concerto; for viola da gamba and other instruments
 Op. 227 – Explosions; for two pianos
 Op. 228 – String Quartet No. 8 Dartmouth Op. 229 – Symphonic Paraphrase, for orchestra
 Op. 230 – Paraphrase on Aarhus Tappenstreg, for piano and orchestra
 Op. 231 – Mini-Symphony; for chamber orchestra
 Op. 232 – String Quartet No. 9
 Op. 233 – Toccata, Aria, and Fugue, for organ
 Op. 234 – Aria with Variations, for spinet
 Op. 235 – Maximillian 1 Suite, for violin and piano
 Op. 236 – Canon Photographs Duet, for viola and piano
 Op. 237 – Duet, for viola and organ
 Op. 238 – Pan on Defensive, An Open Air Sketch, for organ
 Op. 239 – In the Forest Suite, for horn solo
 Op. 240 – Shelley Songs (18), for voice and piano
 Op. 241 – Paganini Variations, for piano
 Op. 242 – Mozart Variations, for piano
 Op. 243 – Piano Concerto No. 7
 Op. 244 – Eastern Gasworks No. 2; for orchestra
 Op. 245 – Bonner Sonata, for piano
 Op. 246 – Vibrations, for prepared piano (graphic notation)
 Op. 247 – Chorus Daniensis No. 2; for piano and orchestra
 Op. 248 – Hofmann Sonata; for piano
 Op. 249 – Chorus Daniensis, for ensemble
 Op. 250 – Vibrations (2nd Version), for prepared piano
 Op. 251
 Op. 251 – Psycho-biological Music; for electronics
 Op. 252 – Songs without Words (4), for piano
 Op. 253 – Italian Comedies (3), for piano
 Op. 254 – Serapion Brothers, for piano
 Op. 255 – Mini Cantata, for children's chorus and percussion (graphic notation)
 Op. 256 – Peep Show, for piano
 Op. 257 – Sonata for 12 instruments; for large ensemble
 Op. 258 – The Plant Garden, opera (incomplete)
 Op. 259 – Duarder Suite, for accordion and percussion
 Op. 260 – Trio, for clarinet, cello, and piano
 Op. 261 – Formula; for orchestra
 Op. 262 – Window Music, for chorus and orchestra
 Op. 263 – Napoleon Sonata, piano
 Op. 264 – Rossini Sonata, piano
 Op. 265 – Devrient Sonata, for piano
 Op. 266 – Extracts; for orchestra (graphic notation)
 Op. 266 – Sonatine in B, for 4H cembalo
 Op. 267 – Busonism Audiovisual Concert Piece; for piano and orchestra
 Op. 268 – Cello Sonata No. 3
 Op. 269 – Clarinet Concerto No. 1
 Op. 270 – Overture and Epilogue for Jenny von Westphalen, for orchestra
 Op. 271 – Julienne, for cello and piano (graphic notation)
 Op. 272 – Epitaph for Igor Stravinsky; for orchestra
 Op. 273 – Pavane, for piano
 Op. 274 – Grosses Trio, for flute, cello, and piano
 Op. 275 – Turkey, Cartography Sonata, for piano
 Op. 275 – Violin Concerto No. 3 Paganini Concerto (incomplete)
 Op. 276 – Choral Songs from Authentic Texts (2), for chorus a capella
 Op. 277 – Trombone Sonata
 Op. 278 – Sextet; for piano and woodwind quintet
 Op. 279 – Pollution Ballad, for mixed chorus
 Op. 280 – Violin sonata No. 6
 Op. 281 – Hommage to Picasso, for piano
 Op. 282 – Hommage to César Franck, for flute and piano
 Op. 283 – La Menagerie Roullier, Cantata, for narrator and instruments
 Op. 284 – Text Sonata, for piano
 Op. 285 – Zeit 17, Interlude, Zeit 18, for voice and string quartet
 Op. 286 – Suite Royal; for wind orchestra
 Op. 287 - Emil Kraepelin Study, for violin solo
 Op. 288 – Lyrical Songs (2), for voice and piano
 Op. 289 – Cello Sonata No. 4
 Op. 290 – Statics, for cello solo
 Op. 291 – Organon Phlenomegno Germanico, for piano
 Op. 292 – Melody and Rhythm, for accordion
 Op. 293 – Purist Variations (9), for piano
 Op. 294 – Saltholm, for orchestra
 Op. 295 – Otto von Guericke Suite, for piano
 Op. 296 – Abstracts, for piano
 Op. 297 – Substance, for piano
 Op. 298 – Improvement and Completion in Concert, for piano
 Op. 299
 Op. 300
 Op. 301 – Trio, for flute, cembalo, and piano
 Op. 302 – Galilæi, for chamber ensemble
 Op. 303 – Viola Concerto
 Op. 304
 Op. 305 – After-Dinner Concert, for piano
 Op. 306 – Suite as Far as Jazz is Concerned, for big band
 Op. 307
 Op. 308
 Op. 309
 Op. 310 – Charming Sound, for chamber ensemble
 Op. 311 – Cello Concerto No. 2
 Op. 312 – From My London Diary, for piano
 Op. 313 – Document 5 No. 1 for orchestra (graphic notation)
 Op. 314 – Flute Sonata?
 Op. 315 – Document 5 No. 2 for orchestra (graphic notation)
 Op. 316 – Bassoon Sonata
 Op. 317 – Sydsjællandske Sonata, for piano
 Op. 318 – Suite, for cello and piano
 Op. 319 – Violin Sonata No. 7
 Op. 320 – Alto Sax Sonata
 Op. 321 – 2nd Collection of Preludes (10), for piano
 Op. 322 – Suite, for violin and piano
 Op. 323 – Micro-Marco, for piano
 Op. 324 – Study on the G-String of Paganini's Violin, for violin solo
 Op. 325 – Solo Element, for piano
 Op. 326 – Piano Sonata No. 11 The Italian Op. 327 – Duo Concertante, for violin and piano
 Op. 328 – The Automaton; opera
 Op. 329 – Wittgenstein Piece, for violin and piano
 Op. 330 – 3 Sonatas and Partitas; violin solo
 Op. 331 – Dar-es-Sallam, for violin and piano
 Op. 332 – Sketches (6), for cello solo
 Op. 333 – Observations. Psycho-biological Suite, for flute, oboe and piano
 Op. 334 – Bones and Flesh Concerto, for two pianos
 Op. 335 – Sounds and Silhouettes, for piano, double-bass (graphic notation)
 Op. 336 – Piano Sonata No. 12
 Op. 337 – The Hoopoe; for chamber orchestra
 Op. 338 – String Quartet No. 10
 Op. 339 – Pupitre 14; for chamber orchestra
 Op. 340 – Sonare Quartet, for recorder, oboe, viola da gamba, and spinet
 Op. 341 – Pianists and Protestors, for piano (incomplete)
 Op. 342 – Joseph von Eichendorff Cycle, for baritone and piano (incomplete)
 Op. 343 – Duettino, for flute and English horn
 Op. 344 – Happy Birthday, for piano
 Op. 345 – Flute Quartet No. 1
 Op. 346 – Four Activities; for SSA chorus
 Op. 347 – Cathegoriæ sacrale No. 1, for chorus
 Op. 348 – Piano Sonata No. 13
 Op. 348 – Bird Song Suite, for piano (graphic notation)
 Op. 349 – Popular Organization No. 1, dedicated to Niels Henrik Nielsen, for organ
 Op. 350 – Popular Organization No. 2, dedicated to Charley Olsen, for organ
 Op. 351 – Popular Organization No. 3, dedicated to Grethe Krogh, for organ
 Op. 352 – Popular Organization No. 4, dedicated to Flemming Dreisig, for organ
 Op. 353 – Dialect, for violin and accordion (graphic notation)
 Op. 354 – Variations on The Volga Boatman; for cello
 Op. 355 – The Bank Manager, opera
 Op. 356 – Chamber Sonata No. 1, for two flutes and organ
 Op. 357 – Chronicle on René Descartes; for orchestra
 Op. 358 – Sonata No. 1, for cello solo
 Op. 359 – Sonata No. 2, for cello solo
 Op. 360 – Sonata No. 3, for cello solo
 Op. 361 – Sonata No. 4, for cello solo (incomplete)
 Op. 362 – Sonata No. 5, for cello solo (incomplete)
 Op. 363 – Sonata No. 6, for cello solo (incomplete)
 Op. 364 – Sonata Popular; for organ and chamber orchestra
 Op. 365 – Dialogue til en horst; for ???
 Op. 366 – Danmark's Cantata; for SATB soloists, choir, and orchestra
 Op. 367 – Stills; for piano and orchestra (incomplete)
 Op. 368 – Flute Quartet No. 2
 Op. 369 – Chropiamonos, for mouth organ and piano
 Op. 370 – Crete, Ancient Variations, for piano
 Op. 371 – Jazz at a Conservatory; for piano
 Op. 372 – Chamber Sonata No. 2, for two flutes and organ
 Op. 373 – Tuba Concerto
 Op. 374 – Violin Concerto No. 4
 Op. 375 – Concerto for Three Types of Clarinet (B, Eb, and Bass)
 Op. 376 – Trio, for violin, cello, and piano
 Op. 377 – Duet, for flute and bassoon
 Op. 378 – Sinfonietta; for brass and percussion
 Op. 379 – The Tempered Piano vol. 2
 Op. 380 – Quartet, for two flutes, bassoon, and cembalo
 Op. 381 – Hommage to Hegel, for flute solo
 Op. 382 – Confirmation Music, for organ
 Op. 383 – Leipzigertage; for piano and orchestra
 Op. 384 – Overture, for piano
 Op. 385 – Flute Quartet No. 3
 Op. 386 – Concerto; for flute and strings
 Op. 387 – Military Marches (3), for wind orchestra
 Op. 388 – Flute Concerto No. 2
 Op. 389 – Bitter Skiffle, for flute, bass flute, and piano
 Op. 390 – Sinfonia Concertante No. 2; for wind quintet and orchestra
 Op. 391 – Symmetrical Sonata, for recorder solo
 Op. 392 – String Quartet No. 11
 Op. 393 – Tuba Sonata
 Op. 394 – Hula-hula Compositions (5), for brass and percussion
 Op. 395 – Hula-hula Compositions (2), for winds and percussion
 Op. 396 – Capriccio; for tuba and orchestra
 Op. 397 – Prelude, for two pianos
 Op. 398 – Study, for seven electric pianos
 Op. 399 – Chimes All Over the World, for electronic tape
 Op. 400 – The Tempered Piano vol. 3
 Op. 401 – Toleranza; for small brass ensemble
 Op. 402 – Sinfonia; for chamber orchestra
 Op. 403 – Hommage to Joseph Beuys (7), various instruments and piano
 Op. 404 – Duell, ballet
 Op. 405 – Quintet; for 4 flutes and piano Spaghetti Op. 406 – Sonata, for flute and organ
 Op. 407 – Nocturne, for violin, cello, accordion, 4H piano, and percussion
 Op. 408 – Sonata No. 2, for flute and organ
 Op. 409 – The Tempered Piano vol. 4
 Op. 410 – Vasco de Gama, for piano
 Op. 411 – Punktum Finale; for orchestra
 Op. 412 – Diatonic Sonata, for tuba and wind quintet
 Op. 413 – Something for a Workshop, for chamber ensemble
 Op. 414 – Adagio; for flute and organ
 Op. 415 – Sarcasm, for flute, piccolo, and organ
 Op. 416 – Hommage to Zurich, Dadaist Suite, for MS, flute, viola, and cello
 Op. 417 – Sonata; for violin, viola, cello, and piano
 Op. 418 – We All Have Some Delay; for brass quintet (semi-aleatoric)
 Op. 419 – Baroque Concerto, for oboe and strings
 Op. 420 – Joseph Beuys Sonata, for piano or prepared piano
 Op. 421 – Knaldperle; for orchestra
 Op. 422 – Viola Sonata
 Op. 423 – Hommage to Man Ray, for flute and piano
 Op. 424 – Variations on The Missing Mouse, for piccolo
 Op. 425 – Hans (Jean) Arp Sonata, for piano and electronic tape
 Op. 426 – Preludes and Fugues (17), for organ
 Op. 426 – In Memory of George Maciunas, for piano and electric piano
 Op. 426 – Breakdown, no instrumentation
 Op. 427 – 1.5 Fugue, for cello and piano
 Op. 428 – The Tempered Piano vol. 5
 Op. 429 - Barraque Dull Odde Suite, for piano
 Op. 430 – In an Atmosphere of Italian Futurism, for orchestra
 Op. 431 – Hyfer, for marimba
 Op. 432 – Symphony No. 15 Marrakesh Op. 433 – Dance and Counter-Dance (5), for 4H piano
 Op. 434 – Fragment, for orchestra
 Op. 435 – Pieces (2), for piano
 Op. 436 – Ultra-Short Pieces (8), for piano
 Op. 437 – Organ Sonata No. 1
 Op. 438 – Variazioni Senza Tema; for piano and orchestra
 Op. 439 – Klavierstykke, for piano
 Op. 440 – Trilogy, for piano
 Op. 441 – Piano Sonata No. 14
 Op. 442 – A Psalm and a Poem; for SATB chorus and orchestra
 Op. 443 – Pariser Suite, for piano
 Op. 444 – Cello Concerto No. 3
 Op. 445 – Horn Concerto
 Op. 446 – Sonata No. 2; for two pianos
 Op. 447 – Piano Sonata No. 15 Salzburg Op. 448 - Annæ-piece, for cello and piano
 Op. 449 – Theme With Variations; for two pianos	
 Op. 450 – Piano Concerto No. 8
 Op. 451 – Observations. Psycho-biological Suite, for flute, oboe and piano (rev.)
 Op. 452 – Piece for Television, for oboe, horn, violin, cello, and piano
 Op. 453 – Violin Concerto No. 3
 Op. 454 – Waltzes (3), for two pianos
 Op. 455 – Reflections, for organ
 Op. 456 – Piano Sonata No. 16
 Op. 457 – Piano Sonata No. 17
 Op. 458 – Inventions (21); for organ
 Op. 459 – Piano Sonata No. 18
 Op. 460 – Piano Sonata No. 19
 Op. 461 – Piano Sonata No. 20
 Op. 462 – Piano Sonata No. 21
 Op. 463 – Psalms (20), for mixed chorus and organ
 Op. 464 – Etudes (16); for cello
 Op. 465 – Mimosas, for organ
 Op. 466 – Easy Sonata, for two pianos
 Op. 467 – Bokkenheuser Elegy, 4H Piano
 Op. 468 – Piano Sonata No. 22
 Op. 469 – DSB Overture; for brass or wind band
 Op. 470 – The Tempered Piano vol. 6
 Op. 471 – Emancipation, for alto sax and piano
 Op. 472 – Ultra-short Pieces (33), for piano
 Op. 473 – Chromatic Sonatina, for piano
 Op. 474 – Climatic Changes; for baritone sax, piano, and chamber ensemble
 Op. 475 – Hommage to Pierre Boulez, for two pianos
 Op. 476 – Hyldest til Ærø, for piano
 Op. 477 – Quartetto Brioso, for flute, violin, viola, and cello
 Op. 478 – Soprano Sax Sonata
 Op. 479 – Theme and Variations, for 4H piano
 Op. 480 – Piece, for soprano sax solo
 Op. 481 – Termalen, for voice, cello, and piano
 Op. 482 – Concerto No. 2, for 2 pianos and orchestra
 Op. 483 – Concertino; for piano, woodwinds, and percussion
 Op. 484 – Tenor Sax Sonata
 Op. 485 – Baritone Sax Sonata
 Op. 486 – Soloists Duo, for two pianos
 Op. 487 – Alceste Overture, for two pianos
 Op. 488 – Concerto; for reduced string section
 Op. 489 – Song Cycle, for soprano and guitar
 Op. 490 – Motivation, for carillon
 Op. 491 – Pezzo I, Pezzo II, for piano
 Op. 492 – Quasi una Passacaglia; for organ
 Op. 493 – Duettino, for flute and guitar
 Op. 494 – Jubilee Prelude, for organ
 Op. 495 – Forest Pieces (6); for piano
 Op. 496 – Amalgam, for two pianos
 Op. 497 – Music of the Firebirds, for 4H Piano
 Op. 498 – Sonatina, for alto sax and piano
 Op. 499 – Spies Composition, for two trumpets and piano
 Op. 500 – Savanorola, opera
 Op. 501 – Institute for Humanistic Studies Composition, for two flutes and piano
 Op. 502 – Sonata, for flute and guitar
 Op. 503 – Sonata, for harp solo
 Op. 504 – Plankton; for 2 pianos and large ensemble
 Op. 505 – Løgumkloster Suite, for piano
 Op. 506 – Goldberg Variations, No. 2, for piano
 Op. 507 – String Quartet in One Movement
 Op. 508 – Ohm, for 4H piano
 Op. 509 – Symphony No. 16
 Op. 510 – Oboe Sonata
 Op. 511 – Surroundings, for string quartet
 Op. 512 – Star Tour Hymn, for piano
 Op. 513 – Airplane March, for piano
 Op. 514 – DSB Gavotte; for violin, cello, and piano
 Op. 515 – Sometimes OK, for ???
 Op. 516
 Op. 517
 Op. 518 – Water Level, for 4H piano
 Op. 519 – String Quartet No. 14
 Op. 520 – The Wild Painter, for three flutes
 Op. 521 – Mini Cantata, for recitative, violin, clarinet, and piano
 Op. 522 – Symphony No. 17
 Op. 523 – Symphony No. 18
 Op. 524 – Symphony No. 19
 Op. 525 – Symphony No. 20
 Op. 526 – Symphony No. 21 Niels Ebbesen Op. 527 – Symphony No. 22
 Op. 528 – Water Music II; for large ensemble
 Op. 529 – Hieroglyph No. 2, for two pianos
 Op. 530 – The Tempered Piano vol. 7
 Op. 531 – Duo concertante; for violin and double bass
 Op. 532 – The Tempered Piano vol. 8
 Op. 533 – Fantasy and Fugue on BACH, for two pianos
 Op. 534 – Forbundne Bassiner, for flute and piano
 Op. 535 – Bolero II; for piano and big band
 Op. 536
 Op. 537 – Ondine II; for piano
 Op. 538 – Poetic Sonatine, Intermezzo, for violin and cello
 Op. 539 – Duo, for violin and viola
 Op. 540 – Bass Sax Sonata
 Op. 541 – The Tempered Piano vol. 9
 Op. 542 – The Tempered Piano vol. 10
 Op. 543 – Poetic Sonatine II, Burla, for oboe solo
 Op. 544 – Hommage to Carl Nielsen, for two pianos
 Op. 545 – Panorama, for 11 instruments
 Op. 546 – The Tempered Piano vol. 11
 Op. 547 – Concerto for Dizzy; for trumpet and orchestra
 Op. 548 – Piece, for big band
 Op. 549 – Chôro Daniensis; for flute, clarinet, cello, guitar, piano, and percussion
 Op. 550 – Pollicino Quartet, for violin, viola, cello, and double-bass
 Op. 551 – Cabaret Voltaire, for guitar
 Op. 552 – Æbeltoft Fanfare, for trumpet
 Op. 553 – Trio No. 4, for violin, cello, and piano
 Op. 554 – The Tempered Piano vol. 12
 Op. 555 – Shells; for sax quartet
 Op. 556 – Symphony No. 23 Kaldet Piræus Op. 557 – The Tragedy of Lady Day, for mezzo-soprano and big band
 Op. 558 –
 Op. 559 – Little Suite, for piano
 Op. 560 – Tribute to the Mediterranean, piano (incomplete)
 Op. 561 – Fantasy I, Intermezzo, Fantasy II, for piano
 Op. 562 – Mazurka, for piano
 Op. 563 – Variations, for piano
 Op. 564 – Johannes the Seducer; for SATB chorus and small ensemble
 Op. 565 – Sainkhonism, for vocal solo and chamber ensemble
 Op. 566 – Quartet, for clarinet (B/A), violin, viola, and cello
 Op. 567 – IV Pezza (quasi una Sonata), for two pianos
 Op. 568 – Copenhagen Suite No. 1; for piano
 Op. 569 – Copenhagen Suite No. 2; for piano
 Op. 570 – Copenhagen Suite No. 3; for piano
 Op. 571 – Copenhagen Suite No. 4; for piano
 Op. 572 – Pyramid; for cello, flute, clarinet, percussion, guitar, and piano
 Op. 573 – Micro Trio, for tuba, violin, and percussion
 Op. 574 – September Quintet, for flute, oboe, violin, cello, and cembalo
 Op. 575 – Opus Pundik, for alto sax and piano
 Op. 576
 Op. 577 – Hus Forbi, for oboe, cello, and piano
 Op. 578 – Chamber Concerto, for clarinet solo and ensemble
 Op. 579 – Spirals, for clarinet, trumpet, and accordion
 Op. 580
 Op. 581
 Op. 582a – La Chien Rouge, for tuba and piano
 Op. 582b – La National Front, for oboe, clarinet, and bassoon
 Op. 583 – Jacques Chirac, for string quartet (associated with Op. 582)
 Op. 583 – Thirty Enzymes, for piano
 Op. 584 – Postulate and Paradox, for piano
 Op. 585 – Pneus, for piano
 Op. 586 – Infiltration, for piano
 Op. 587
 Op. 588
 Op. 589 – Prophilactic Prognosis, for piano
 Op. 590 – Kortspil, chamber opera (incomplete)
 Op. 591 – Can you Hear Gershwin?, chamber opera (incomplete)
 Op. 592
 Op. 593
 Op. 594
 Op. 595 – String Quartet No. 16
 Op. 596
 Op. 597 – Symphony No. 24
 Op. 598 – Concertino, for two pianos
 Op. 599 – Piano Sonata No. 23
 Op. 600 – Little Studio Suite, for piano
 Op. 601 – Chamber Concert, for solo piano, two bassoons, and percussion
 Op. 602
 Op. 603
 Op. 604
 Op. 605
 Op. 606
 Op. 607
 Op. 608 – Tsetse Fly, for flute, clarinet, violin, cello, guitar, piano, and percussion
 Op. 609
 Op. 610
 Op. 611 – Naïve Song, for mezzo-soprano and piano (incomplete)
 Op. 612
 Op. 613 – Vermichte Bemerkungen, for small ensemble
 Op. 614 – Musical Menu, for flute, oboe, violins, cello, and cembalo (incomplete)
 Op. 615
 Op. 616 – Motto Hafniensis, for piano
 Op. 617a – Prologue, for soprano, clarinet, and piano
 Op. 617b – Trenologue, for soprano, clarinet and piano
 Op. 618 – Hymn for the Extra! Newspaper, for voice and piano
 Op. 619
 Op. 620 – Ghost Stories (3), for alto and ensemble
 Op. 621 – Cellism, for 12 cellos
 Op. 622
 Op. 623
 Op. 624 – Piano Sonata No. 26
 Op. 625 – Piano Sonata No. 27
 Op. 626 – Piano Sonata No. 28
 Op. 627 – Piano Sonata No. 29 Taiwanese Op. 628
 Op. 629
 Op. 630 – First Glitters, for voice and ensemble
 Op. 631 – Pezzo, for piano
 Op. 632 – Mantziu Sonata, for piano
 Op. 632 – Quartet Brevo, for flute, clarinet, cello, and piano
 Op. 633 – The Tempered Piano vol. 13
 Op. 634 – Piano Sonata No. 30 Fetish Op. 635
 Op. 636 – Piano Sonata No. 31 Brøndsonata Op. 637
 Op. 638 – The Tempered Piano vol. 14
 Op. 639
 Op. 640
 Op. 641
 Op. 642
 Op. 643
 Op. 644
 Op. 645
 Op. 646
 Op. 647
 Op. 648
 Op. 649
 Op. 650 – Anti-Democratic Hymn to the Health Minister, for bari sax, trumpets, etc.
 Op. 651 – Anti-Attention Hymn to the Social Minister, for clarinet, harp, and guitar
 Op. 652 – Anti-Murder Hymn to the Labor Minister, for English Horn, tuba, cello
 Op. 653
 Op. 654
 Op. 655
 Op. 656
 Op. 657
 Op. 658
 Op. 659
 Op. 660
 Op. 661
 Op. 662 – As a Man Approaches Eighty, for piano
 Op. 663 – In Memory of Heitor Villa-Lobos, for piano (incomplete)
 Op. 664 – Strumenta Diabolica; for guitar

 Pieces without opus number 
 Jazz Hieroglyph (?); for two pianos (1950)
 Fanfare; for 4 recorders and strings (1956)
 Reflections; for organ (1985)
 Beethoven en Face, for piano (1987)
 Postcard-Composition, for variable instrumentation (aleatoric) (1992)
 Contrapunctus XIV (org. unfinished by J.S. Bach), for organ (1993)
 26 Fragments, for piano (based on Op. 436, Op. 559) (1996)
 Song from Joyce's Ulysses, for soprano and piano (1998)
 Tosatset, for cello solo (1998)
 For Six Hands, for 6H piano (1999)
 Pezzo, for saxophone, cornet, horn, tuba, violin, cello, cembalo, and perc (1999)

 Further reading 
 Mollerhoj, Klaus (1980). Niels Viggo Bentzons kompositioner : en fortegnelse over vrkerne med opusnummer''. Copenhagen: Wilhelm Hansen. . .  ; .

Bentzon, Niels